is a passenger railway station in located in the city of  Wakayama, Wakayama Prefecture, Japan, operated by the private railway company Wakayama Electric Railway.

Lines
Kōtsū Center Mae Station is served by the Kishigawa Line, and is located 4.8 kilometers from the terminus of the line at Wakayama Station.

Station layout
The station consists of one side platform serving  single bi-directional track. The station is unattended.

Adjacent stations

History
Kōtsū Center Mae Station opened on May 7, 1999

Passenger statistics

Surrounding Area
Wakayama Prefectural Police Headquarters Transportation Center
 Wakayama Prefectural Wakayama Kotsu Park
Wakayama City Hall Okazaki Branch

See also
List of railway stations in Japan

References

External links
 
 Kōtsū Center Mae Station timetable

Railway stations in Japan opened in 1999
Railway stations in Wakayama Prefecture
Wakayama (city)